The 2016 Silk Way Rally was run in Russia, Kazakhstan, and China on July 9–24, 2016.

It began in Moscow on the 9th and ends in Beijing on the 24th.
It features the primary classes of cars and trucks.

Official winners are Cyril Despres and Ayrat Mardeev.

Entries

Stages

Stage results

Cars

Final standings

Cars

Trucks

References

External links
 

Silk Way Rally
Silk Way Rally
Silk Way Rally
Silk Way Rally
Silk Way Rally
Silk Way Rally